The United Kingdom's Permanent Representative to the United Nations and Other International Organisations in Geneva is the United Kingdom's Permanent Representative to the United Nations Office at Geneva and other international organisations based in Geneva including the World Trade Organization, the International Organization for Migration, the International Committee of the Red Cross and other non-governmental organizations. Permanent Representatives normally hold the personal rank of Ambassador.

List of permanent representatives
1971–1973: Sir Frederick Mason
1973–1976: Sir David Hildyard
1976–1978: Sir James Bottomley
1979–1983: Sir Peter Marshall
1983–1985: Dame Anne Warburton
1985–1990: John Sankey
1990–1993: Martin Morland
1993–1997: Nigel Williams
1997–2000: Sir Roderic Lyne
2000–2003: Simon Fuller
2003–2008: Nicholas Thorne
2008–2012: Peter Gooderham
2012–2015: Karen Pierce

2015–: Julian Braithwaite

See also
List of Permanent Representatives of the United Kingdom to the Conference on Disarmament

References

External links
United Kingdom Mission to the United Nations, Geneva
United Nations Office at Geneva

United Nations Geneva
United Kingdom
 
United Kingdom and the United Nations
United Kingdom